Barnala (station code: BNN) is a railway station located in Barnala district in the Indian state of Punjab and serves Barnala city which is the administrative headquarter of the district. Barnala station falls under Ambala railway division of Northern Railway zone of Indian Railways.

Overview 
This station is located on the single track,  broad gauge, Dhuri–Bathinda section of Bathinda–Rajpura line.

Electrification 
Barnala railway station is situated on single track electrified line. There are two electrified tracks at the station. The 68 km-long stretch from Dhuri station to Lehra Muhabbat station on Bathinda–Rajpura line was completed in July 2020, thereby providing complete electrification on Bathinda–Rajpura line.

Amenities 
Barnala railway station has 5 booking windows and all basic amenities like drinking water, public toilets, sheltered area with adequate seating. There is one platforms at the station. and one foot overbridge (FOB).

References

External links 

 Pictures of Barnala railway station

Railway stations in Barnala district
Ambala railway division
Barnala district